Elmhurst School for Boys is a private day preparatory and pre-preparatory school for boys aged three to eleven located in South Croydon, England. It is the successor to two schools both founded in 1869.

History
The school has its origins in two educational establishments dating from 1869. In that year Allen Carr and his wife opened a school for young boys in Croydon. He died in 1875 and his widow, Elizabeth, continued the school. In 1885 she bought an empty property called "Elmhurst" in St Peter's Road, South Croydon, and moved the school there. The other 1869 foundation was opened by Clarissa Prince at her father's house, "The Chalet", Croydon. She was assisted by her sister Florence and others. In the 1880s their pupils included the young P.G. Wodehouse and his two elder brothers. In 1894 the sisters bought Elmhurst from Elizabeth Carr and moved their school there. They called their establishment "Elmhurst School, for the Sons of Gentlemen".

The previous Principal, Henry Wickham, who purchased the school in 2009, is the husband of the author Sophie Kinsella.

The current parent company is Bellevue Education International Limited, which bought the school from Wickham in October 2013. Bellevue bought the school as part of acquisitions driven by funding derived largely from Tarek Obaid, the founder of the oil company PetroSaudi, which has been implicated in the 1Malaysia Development Berhad scandal.

Curriculum
The Elmhurst curriculum incorporates the National Curriculum, which is followed throughout the school at Key Stages 1 and 2 in Maths, English, Science and Technology (including Computer Studies), History, Geography, Art, Music and PE. The National Curriculum is extended by the school's own syllabus and schemes of work in these subjects. Religious Education is also taught with the emphasis on Moral Education, the principles being the same for all religions. French is taught throughout the school.

School houses
Elmhurst School for Boys has four school houses: Scott (blue), Peachell (green) - formerly Leisk House, Squire (yellow) - formerly School House, Anderson (red) - formerly Seddon House. The names of the houses are the surnames of previous owners of the school.

Notable old boys
P.G. Wodehouse, (at Clarissa Price's predecessor school), humorist
Tom Sharpe, satirical author
Roger Norman Freeman, Baron Freeman, former Conservative MP and Chancellor of the Duchy of Lancaster
Tarik O'Regan, composer

External links
Elmhurst School for Boys'
Geograph.org.uk

References

Private schools in the London Borough of Croydon
Preparatory schools in London
Educational institutions established in 1869
Private boys' schools in London
1869 establishments in England